Clement "Clem" Quirke Lane was the city editor for the Chicago Daily News from 1942 to 1958. Born in 1897, he joined the Chicago Daily News after high school, where during Prohibition he worked the crime beat. As described in Capone: The Life and World of Al Capone, legend has it that many of the often-comical nicknames for Chicago's underworld figures, including "Greasy Thumb" Gusik, "Loudmouth" Levine, and "Violet" Fusco, can be credited “to James Doherty, a Chicago Tribune crime reporter, and Clem Lane, a Chicago Daily News rewrite man, who supposedly amused themselves on slow nights by coining them."

Later he became a columnist, where in 1938 he invented the characters "Oxie O'Rourke" and "Torchnose McGonigle." These were figures in the vein of predecessor Chicago newspaperman Finley Peter Dunne's "Mr. Dooley" and "Mr. Henessey," stand-ins for the "voice of the people." Chicago Daily News columnist Mike Royko would take up that tradition afterwards with his character "Slats Grobnik." According to a Time magazine article about his work in January 1944, Lane said, in reference to his creation, Oxie was "the perfect answer for a newspaperman; he can't be scooped because he knows everything. He is the voice of the people west of the tracks."

Lane was known for his temper; according to his obituary he "ruled the city staff ... in fiery justice." A reporter who began his career under Lane, James McCartney, described him later as "the archetype of the old-fashioned city editor, an Irish Catholic, reformed alcoholic with a high school education, a great mane of white hair ... irascible, immensely honest, tremendously talented, the personification of the newspaper ... and very, very difficult to work for."

According to Peter Smith’s memoir, A Cavalcade of Lesser Horrors—in part about Smith’s relationship to his father, John Justin Smith, one of Lane’s reporters—Lane produced a memo to guide the writing on his paper sometime in the 1950s. Smith has reproduced that document:

The memo is a notable model of mid-century American newspaper style, whose roots may perhaps go back, through Ernest Hemingway and Mark Twain, to Abraham Lincoln’s Gettysburg Address.

Later in life Lane became involved in Alcoholics Anonymous, helping to establish it in Chicago after that group's founding in Akron, Ohio, in 1935.

References

External links
 Time (magazine)

American newspaper editors
Chicago Daily News people